The Spartan C4 was an American four-seat cabin monoplane designed and built by the Spartan Aircraft Company.

Design and development
The first model was the C4-225 a high-wing braced monoplane powered by a  Wright J-6 radial engine. Only five C4-235 aircraft were built and they were followed by one C4-300 with a  Wright R-975 radial engine, and the C4-301 with a  Pratt & Whitney Wasp Junior.

Variants
C4-225
Production aircraft powered by a  Wright J-6 radial engine, five built.
C4-300
Variant with a  Wright R-975 radial engine, one built.
C4-301
Variant with a  Pratt & Whitney Wasp Junior  radial engine, one built.

Specifications (C4-225)

See also

References

Notes

Bibliography
 
 

1930s United States civil utility aircraft
Spartan Aircraft Company aircraft
High-wing aircraft
Aircraft first flown in 1930